Chris Woodhouse is an American recording engineer, record producer and multi-instrumentalist. He is best known for his work with the San Francisco-based garage rock acts, Thee Oh Sees, Ty Segall, The Intelligence, Sic Alps and Fuzz.

Alongside his recording duties, Woodhouse is a former member of both The Intelligence and Mayyors, and often contributes musically to Thee Oh Sees. He was listed as a full contributing band member on the band's studio albums, Drop (2014) and Mutilator Defeated At Last (2015).

Career
Woodhouse's former "home base" studio was The Dock in Sacramento, California.

Discography

References

Living people
Record producers from California
American audio engineers
Year of birth missing (living people)
Place of birth missing (living people)
Businesspeople from Sacramento, California
Engineers from California